Afutara Airport is an airport near the village of Afutara on Malaita in the Solomon Islands .
It is 37.89 miles from Auki airport.

Airlines and destinations

References

Airports in the Solomon Islands